Muralinagar is a neighbourhood of Visakhapatnam, Andhra Pradesh, India. It has a residential growth of many buildings. Passport seva kendram is situated on the national highway passes through this area called birla junction. It is a hub for automobile show rooms.

Transport
This area connected with all parts of the city.

References

Neighbourhoods in Visakhapatnam